Madhav Kaushik (born 3 January 1998) is an Indian cricketer. He made his first-class debut for Uttar Pradesh in the 2018–19 Ranji Trophy on 1 November 2018. He made his Twenty20 debut for Uttar Pradesh in the 2018–19 Syed Mushtaq Ali Trophy on 12 March 2019. He made his List A debut on 17 October 2019, for Uttar Pradesh in the 2019–20 Vijay Hazare Trophy.

References

External links
 

1998 births
Living people
Indian cricketers
Uttar Pradesh cricketers
Cricketers from Delhi